Paul Eugene Zeltner (October 11, 1925 – May 26, 2018) was an American politician who served in the California State Assembly for District 54 and during World War II era, he served in the United States Navy.

Zelter was discharged from the navy as a gunner's mate 2nd class. He then served as Deputy Sheriff for the Los Angeles County Sheriff for 26 years. He served on the Lakewood City Council before his surprise election to the solidly Democratic-voting 54th. California state Assembly district in 1986  In 1988, he sought a second term and was narrowly defeated for reelection by Willard Murray. He died on May 26, 2018, at the age of 92.

References

1925 births
2018 deaths
Republican Party members of the California State Assembly
Politicians from Philadelphia
United States Navy non-commissioned officers
20th-century American politicians